La Cage aux Folles may refer to:

 La Cage aux Folles (play), 1973 French play
 La Cage aux Folles (film), 1978 French-Italian film adapted from the play
La Cage aux Folles II, 1980 sequel
La Cage aux Folles 3: 'Elles' se marient, 1985 sequel
 La Cage aux Folles (musical),  1983 musical adapted from the play

See also
 The Birdcage, 1996 American film adapted from the play
 La Cage (disambiguation)